WPIR (89.9 FM) is a Christian adult contemporary formatted broadcast radio station licensed to Culpeper, Virginia. It serves the Northern Virginia area from a transmitter near Warrenton, Virginia, and simulcasts its sister station WPER. The station is owned and operated by Baker Family Stations.

Combined 89.5/90.5 history

In January 2006, Positive Alternative Radio bought the old CSN-Virginia, a network of four full-power stations and almost two dozen translators that formerly broadcast programming from local Calvary Chapel churches alongside KAWZ's Calvary Satellite Network. In the buyout, these stations were split between the then-WPER and WRXT in Lynchburg. WPER obtained WJYJ, based out of Fredericksburg, and seven of the translators, increasing its range of its new network all the way down to Richmond, Williamsburg, and even Buckingham County. Accordingly, WPER changed all promotional materials from "Positive Hits 89.9 WPER" to "Positive Hits 89.9 and the NEW 90.5".

WPIR swapped call signs with sister station WPER on February 20, 2018.

Translators

WPIR is relayed by three translators to widen its broadcast area. Co-owned WPER relays the same programming on additional translators.

References

External links
 WPER Online
 

Contemporary Christian radio stations in the United States
Radio stations established in 1999
1999 establishments in Virginia
PIR